The Nicholas County Courthouse in Summersville, West Virginia is a Neoclassical Revival building, designed in 1895 and not completed until 1898. The primary building material was locally quarried Lower Gilbert Sandstone. A jail was added in 1910. A further addition was designed by Levi J. Dean in 1940 and executed by the Works Progress Administration. The addition reflects Art Deco influences.

References

Art Deco architecture in West Virginia
Buildings and structures in Nicholas County, West Virginia
Neoclassical architecture in West Virginia
County courthouses in West Virginia
Courthouses on the National Register of Historic Places in West Virginia
Government buildings completed in 1898
Works Progress Administration in West Virginia
National Register of Historic Places in Nicholas County, West Virginia